The Cotai Arena is an indoor arena located on the premises of The Venetian Macao, on the Cotai Strip, in Macau, China. It opened in 2007 with a seating capacity of 15,000. The arena was known as Venetian Arena from 2007 to 2010, when it was renamed as CotaiArena. It hosts sporting events such as basketball, tennis and boxing, as well as concerts and international televised awards shows.

Notable events
 Annually: Miss Macau Beauty Pageant
 United States Basketball International Challenge: United States, Lithuania, Turkey
 The Amazing Race Australia - third leg
 2007 Asian Indoor Games - closing ceremonies
 20 October 2007: Cleveland Cavaliers vs Orlando Magic - NBA exhibition match
 3 November 2007: The Beyoncé Experience by Beyoncé
 26 January 2008: Ray Mercer vs Derric Rossy - heavyweight title flight
 15 March 2008: Celine Dion brought her Taking Chances Tour to the arena
 November 2008 The Venetian Macao Tennis Showdown
 15 August 2009: Lady Gaga brought The Fame Ball Tour to the arena
 25 October 2009: Andre Agassi vs Pete Sampras - exhibition tennis match
 2009: IIFA Awards
 2010 Mnet Asian Music Awards - South Korean music awards show organised by Mnet Media
 29 Dec 2011 to 1 Jan 2012: Cantopop Legend, 'God of Songs' Jacky Cheung held his 'Jacky Cheung 1/2 Century World Tour'.
 2012: Zee Cine Awards
 9 and 10 March 2012: Super Show 4 World Tour by South Korean boy band Super Junior. They also became the first Korean singers to hold two consecutive shows in Macau, with a sold-out crowd of 26,756 people.
 31 March 2012: Jam Hsiao World Tour 2012 by Taiwanese Mandopop singer Jam Hsiao
10 November 2012: UFC on Fuel TV: Franklin vs. Le
 2013: IIFA Awards
13 and 14 September 2013: Diamonds World Tour by Barbadian pop singer Rihanna
12 October 2013: Believe Tour by Justin Bieber
23 November 2013: Welterweight Boxing bout between Manny Pacquiao and Brandon Ríos
30 November 2013: Super Show 5 World Tour by South Korean boy band Super Junior.
15 February 2014: Girls' Generation World Tour Girls & Peace by South Korean girl band Girls' Generation.
 9 March 2014 : 50 & Counting Tour Asia Tour by The Rolling Stones
 23 April 2014: 18th China Music Awards (CMA) by Star China Media Ltd
 1, 2 and 3 May 2014: X.X.X. Live Tour concert by Hong Kong singer-songwriter G.E.M.
 23 August 2014: UFC Fight Night: Bisping vs. Le
 17 October 2014: All or Nothing World Tour by South Korean girl group 2NE1
 22 November 2014: Welterweight Boxing bout between Manny Pacquiao and Chris Algieri
 1 March 2015: Super Show 6 World Tour by South Korean boy band Super Junior, With a sold-out crowd of 14,750 fans, It is the second biggest audience at the Cotai Arena in a single concert after Super Show 7 World Tour in 2018.
 1 and 2 May 2015: The Prismatic World Tour by American singer and songwriter Katy Perry.
 23, 24 and 25 October 2015: sold-out concerts for Made World Tour by BIGBANG
 21 November 2015: EXO PLANET #2 - The EXO’luXion by South Korean boy band EXO  with a sold-out crowd of 13,108 people.
 18 February 2017: Race Start! Season 4 - Running Man Fan Meeting 2017 by the members of Running Man, as the second Running Man fan-meeting of 2017.
 25 March 2017: Asia Tour "The Rebirth Of J" in Macau by South Korean singer Kim Jaejoong
 17 and 18 June 2017: two sold-out shows for Act III: M.O.T.T.E World Tour by G-Dragon
 4 November 2017: 2017 BTS Live Trilogy Episode III: The Wings Tour by BTS (band)
 17 November 2017: Live performance by YouTube star performers V Minor. 
 12 May 2018: Super Show 7 World Tour by South Korean boy band Super Junior, it is the biggest audience at the venue in a single concert and the number one with the highest-grossing in Cotai Arena history
 24 February 2018: Queen of Hearts World Tour concert by Hong Kong singer-songwriter G.E.M.
 29 and 30 June 2018: Celine Dion Live 2018 by Celine Dion
 10 and 11 August 2018: Exo Planet 4 - The EℓyXiOn by South Korean boy band EXO
 30 September 2018: Joker Xue Skyscraper World Tour by Chinese singer-songwriter Joker Xue
 20 October 2018: The Number 1's Tour by Mariah Carey
 8 June 2019: Blackpink World Tour (In Your Area) by South Korean girl group Blackpink
 26 and 27 July 2019: The Twenty Tour by Westlife, first date announced as sold out in just a few seconds after its ticket sales opening.
 13 October 2019: Shawn Mendes: The Tour by Shawn Mendes

See also
 Events and festivals in Macau

References

Indoor arenas in Macau
Basketball venues in China
Boxing venues in China
2007 establishments in Macau
Badminton venues